Ham or Hahm  is a Western and Korean surname.

In 2000 in South Korea, there were approximately 75,955 people with this surname. It is also used in North Korea. Although some sources claim there are as many as sixty Ham clans, only the Gangneung Ham clan can be documented. Ham Gyu (Hanja: 咸規), a Goryeo general from the thirteenth century, is considered the founding ancestor of the Ham clan.

People with the surname include:

Ham (Korean surname) 
 Ham Tae-young (1873–1964), Korean politician, 3rd Vice president of First Republic of South Korea
 Ham Seok-heon (1901–1989), Korean Quaker author and activist
 Ham Heung-chul (1930–2000), South Korean footballer
 Ham Kee-yong (born 1930), South Korean long-distance runner, winner of the 1950 Boston Marathon
 Ham Hyun-gi (born 1962), South Korean footballer
 Ham Jeung-im (born 1964), South Korean writer, professor, and former literary editor
 Ham Pong-sil (born 1974), North Korean long-distance runner
 Donhee Ham (born 1974), Gordon McKay Professor of Applied Physics and Electrical Engineering at Harvard University
 Han Da-min (born 1983), South Korean actress, (Original Name : Ham Mi-na) 
 Ham Ji-hoon (born 1984) South Korean basketball player
 Ham Chan-mi (born 1994), South Korean swimmer
 Ham Eun-ji (born 1997), South Korean weightlifter
 Ham Jang-sik (born 1994) South Korean retired professional League of Legends player and analyst known by the ID "Lustboy"
 Ham Deok-ju (born 1995), South Korean professional baseball pitcher 
 Ham Won-jin (born 2001), South Korean singer and child actor, member of the South Korean boy group Cravity

Hahm (Korean surname) 
 Hahm Eun-Jung (born 1988), South Korean singer and actress, member of the South Korean girl group T-ara
 Shinik Hahm (born 1958), Korean-American conductor

Ham (Western surname) 
 Arlene Ham (born 1936), American former politician in South Dakota
 Arthur Ham (1902–1992), Canadian histologist and tennis player
 Arthur Ham (golfer) (1891–1959), English golfer
 Bill Ham (1937–2016), American music impresario, best known as the manager, producer and image-maker for the blues-rock band ZZ Top
 Boris van der Ham (born 1973), Dutch writer, humanist, former politician and actor
 Darvin Ham (born 1973), American retired professional basketball player and current National Basketball Association assistant coach
 Greg Ham (1953–2012), Australian songwriter, actor and musician, member of the band Men at Work
 Jack Ham (born 1948), American retired National Football League player, member of the Pro Football Hall of Fame
 John Ham (disambiguation), also Hamm, several people
 Jon Hamm (born 1971), American actor, director and producer
 Ken Ham (born 1951), Australian-born Christian fundamentalist and young Earth creationist
 Kenneth Ham (born 1964), American retired astronaut and US Navy captain
 Marieke van den Ham (born 1983), Dutch water polo player
 Mary Katharine Ham (born 1980), American journalist and conservative commentator
 Mordecai Ham (1877–1961), American evangelist and temperance movement leader
 Paul Ham, Australian author, historian, journalist and publisher
 Pete Ham (1947–1975), Welsh singer, songwriter and guitarist, member of the rock band Badfinger
 Tracy Ham (born 1965), American retired Canadian Football League quarterback

Hahm (Western surname) 
 Walther Hahm (1894-1951), German World War II general

See also
 Xian (surname), Han Chinese version
 Hamm (surname), an English, German and Scottish surname
 List of Korean family names
 Korean name

References

English-language surnames
Korean-language surnames